1544 Vinterhansenia, provisional designation , is a dark asteroid from the inner regions of the asteroid belt, approximately 22 kilometers in diameter. It was discovered on 15 October 1941, by Finnish astronomer Liisi Oterma at Turku Observatory in Southwest Finland, and named for Danish astronomer Julie Vinter Hansen.

Orbit and classification 

Vinterhansenia is classified as both C-type and X-type asteroid. It orbits the Sun in the inner main-belt at a distance of 2.1–2.6 AU once every 3 years and 8 months (1,335 days). Its orbit has an eccentricity of 0.11 and an inclination of 3° with respect to the ecliptic. Its first used observation, was also taken at Heidelberg in 1928, and extends the body's observation arc by 13 years prior to its official discovery observation at Turku in 1941.

Lightcurves 

Two rotational lightcurves of Vinterhansenia were obtained from photometric observations taken by Kevin Ivarsen in October 2003, and Laurent Bernasconi in March 2005. Lightcurve analysis gave a rotation period of 13.7 and 13.77 hours with a brightness variation of 0.15 and 0.18 magnitude, respectively.

Diameter and albedo 

According to the space-based surveys carried out by the Infrared Astronomical Satellite IRAS, and NASA's Wide-field Infrared Survey Explorer with its subsequent NEOWISE mission, Vinterhansenia measures between 20.76 and 26.23 kilometers in diameter, and its surface has an albedo between 0.040 and 0.078. The Collaborative Asteroid Lightcurve Link assumes an albedo of 0.0599 and a diameter of 21.63 kilometers with an absolute magnitude of 12.0.

Naming 

This minor planet was named for Danish astronomer Julie Vinter Hansen (1890–1960), who worked at the Copenhagen Observatory and was director of the International Astronomical Union's telegram bureau and Editor of its Circulars (also see Central Bureau for Astronomical Telegrams) The official  was published by the Minor Planet Center in January 1956.

References

External links 
 Asteroid Lightcurve Database (LCDB), query form (info )
 Dictionary of Minor Planet Names, Google books
 Asteroids and comets rotation curves, CdR – Observatoire de Genève, Raoul Behrend
 Discovery Circumstances: Numbered Minor Planets (1)-(5000) – Minor Planet Center
 
 

 

001544
Discoveries by Liisi Oterma
Named minor planets
19411015